The 1961 Brisbane Carnival was the 15th edition of the Australian National Football Carnival, an Australian football interstate competition. It was the last carnival to be held in Queensland.

It was one of the most competitive carnivals to have been played, with the traditional carnival powerhouse Victoria going down to Western Australia in the final game to give Western Australia its first carnival victory since 1921. Despite Victoria comfortably accounting for South Australia, the Western Australians narrowly lost their game to South Australia. Tasmania, who traditionally struggle, lost all games but got within seven points of the South Australians.  With Western Australia, South Australia and Victoria all finishing on 2 wins and a loss, Western Australia won the championship due to a superior percentage.

In 2014, the Western Australian team from this carnival was inducted as a whole into the West Australian Football Hall of Fame.

Teams
Although the carnival took place in Brisbane, no Queensland team competed in the tournament. The four teams were Victoria, Western Australia, South Australia and Tasmania.

Western Australia Squad

Although John Colgan was named in the squad, he had to withdraw due to injury.

Results

Points table

All-Australian team
In 1961 the All-Australian team was picked based on the Brisbane Carnival.  Ron Barassi was named as captain.  West Australian ruckman Jack Clarke became the first person to be named in four All Australian teams.

Tassie Medal
Brian Dixon of the VFL won the Tassie Medal after beating East Fremantle's Jack Clarke by one vote.

References

Australian rules interstate football
Brisbane Carnival, 1961